The 1980 World Junior Curling Championships were held from March 10 to 15 at the Kitchener Memorial Auditorium in Kitchener, Ontario, Canada.  The tournament only had a men's event.

Teams

Round robin

  Teams to playoffs

Playoffs

Final standings

Awards
 WJCC Sportsmanship Award:  Andrew McQuistin

All-Star Team:
Skip:  Mert Thompsett
Third:  Lyle Derry
Second:  Hugh Aitken
Lead:  Erik Pettersson

References

1980 in Ontario
Curling in Ontario
1980 in Canadian curling
1980
Sport in Kitchener, Ontario
International curling competitions hosted by Canada
March 1980 sports events in Canada
1980 in youth sport